The following is an overview of the events of 1984 in motorsport including the major racing events, motorsport venues that were opened and closed during a year, championships and non-championship events that were established and disestablished in a year, and births and deaths of racing drivers and other motorsport people.

Annual events
The calendar includes only annual major non-championship events or annual events that had significance separate from the championship. For the dates of the championship events see related season articles.

Disestablished championships/events

Births

Deaths

See also
List of 1984 motorsport champions

References

External links

 
Motorsport by year